Qaradolaq (known as Şaumyankənd until 1991) is a village and municipality in the Aghjabadi Rayon of Azerbaijan.  It has a population of 2,746.

References 

Populated places in Aghjabadi District